Nadia Grace Eicher Mejia (born 22 November 1995) is an American-Ecuadorian model and beauty pageant titleholder who won Miss California USA 2016 and placed in the Top 5 at Miss USA 2016.

Mejia is the daughter of Ecuadorian-born musician Gerardo Mejía, best known for the 1990s song "Rico Suave", and Kathy Eicher, Miss West Virginia USA 1989, and appeared with her family on the reality television show Suave Says.  She is a 2013 graduate of Diamond Bar High School.  Mejia works as a model and is signed to Next Management. She once suffered from anorexia.

Mejia won the Miss California USA 2016 title in November 2016 after previously competing three times for Miss California Teen USA and making the top twenty at Miss California USA 2015.  She went on to represent California at the Miss USA 2016 pageant where she was voted Fan Favourite and made the top five. Mejia's open sharing of her body image struggle was praised as a contributing factor for winning the fan favourite vote, however her failed attempt at answering a question about economics during the interview competition was also widely reported in the media.

In 2018, Mejía was featured in major advertising campaigns for Skechers and Too Faced Cosmetics.

References 

1995 births
American beauty pageant winners
American people of Ecuadorian descent
Beauty pageant contestants from California
Living people
Miss USA 2016 delegates
People from Diamond Bar, California